The Socialist Workers' Party, previously known as the Workers Party for Socialism (Partido de Trabajadores por el Socialismo), is a Trotskyist political party in Argentina. It was founded in 1988, as the first schism of the Movement for Socialism (MAS), a Trotskyist party led by Nahuel Moreno until his death. Within the next four years, the MAS split into more than 20 groups.

In the presidential election of 2007 it obtained 95,000 votes (0,57%). The number of voters for this party in the 2003 parliamentary election was 42,331 (about 0.25%). In the 1999 presidential election the party had obtained 43,911 votes (about 0.23%).

Located on the left side of the political spectrum and member of the Workers' Left Front, the PTS aims to establish a working-class government that breaks with capitalism, putting forth a material hegemonic force grounded in the main combats and organization processes of the working class—such as the student and women's movement—, seeking to develop revolutionary factions within them.

By establishing this electoral coalition, the PTS managed to enter the Argentine Congress for the first time after the legislative elections of 2013. As part of the Front, it obtained representation in the Buenos Aires Legislature, as well as the provincial legislatures of Buenos Aires, Córdoba, Jujuy, Mendoza and Neuquén and in the city councils of Godoy Cruz, Las Heras, Maipú and Mendoza in Mendoza and the city councils of Libertador General San Martín, Palpalá and San Salvador in Jujuy. It has one national deputy, Nicolás del Caño; current or recent provincial deputies include Christian Castillo, Raúl Godoy, Myriam Bregman and Laura Vilches.

The PTS has presence in 15 provinces and in Buenos Aires City; its members have minor seats in the Buenos Aires Underground union (AGTSyP), the Neuquén ceramics workers union (SOECN), the Western Soapmakers Workers Union (SOJO), as well as occupying secretaries in the United Argentinian Tire Workers Trade Union (SUTNA), the United Trade Union of Education Workers (SUTE, Mendoza) and several sections of the Buenos Aires Education Workers Trade Union (SUTEBA) etc. Its youth branch conducts the student unions in highschools, and the universities of Buenos Aires (UBA), La Plata (UNLP), General Sarmiento (UNGS), Quilmes (UNQ) and Comahue (UNCo). The PTS also publishes the digital newspaper La Izquierda Diario (the daily left), located among the top 100 most visited websites in the country.

History

Origins 

It emerged in 1988 as a schism within the Movement for Socialism (MAS); starting as the Internationalist Bolshevik Faction, an inner faction that had formed towards the MAS's third congress. In its first documents, the PTS declared that the MAS had a revisionist definition of internationalism and had degenerated into a "national-trotskyist" organization, polemising against the MAS's then-official policy that claimed that "Argentina was the center of world revolution". In these documents, the PTS upheld the political legacy of Nahuel Moreno and held that the MAS's leadership had "degenerated" after Moreno's death. Later, however, after suffering three schisms, the PTS published several critical balance sheets about Moreno's positions, leading to a break with his tendency, the IWL.
Currently, the PTS defines itself as:

Labour movement 

The Socialist Workers' Party has presence in several unions. They occupy seats in the leadership of the Buenos Aires subway union (AGTSyP), is part of the joint Multicolor slate that leads nine sections of the teachers' union of the Buenos Aires Province (SUTEBA), they also were part of the opposition slate in the Buenos Aires Graphic Federation and is part of the union leadership in several graphic companies. The Violet slate (whose members include PTS militants and independent activists) is the main opposition slate within the telephone union (FOETRA), the PTS also leads the opposition slate in the food union (STIA), where it is part of the union leadership within the factories with the largest number of workers. Aside from its presence in unions and guilds, the PTS has an extensive presence within internal commissions and delegates in industrial companies (soapmakers, soda workers, metalworkers, steelers, etc.), services (railroad workers, aeronautical workers, etc.) and state and health workers, etc.

The PTS has also spearheaded some of the most important conflicts within the industrial labour movement that have shaken the publicopinion, such as leading the struggle of the occupied tile factory FaSinPat (formerly Zanón), which led to the filming of the documentary The Take by Naomi Klein, as well as the struggle in the Kraft Foods factory (now Mondelez) in 2009. More recently, they were active participants in the occupation of the Donnelley printing factory, a conflict that gained wide national trascendence and is currently a worker-controlled factory. The PTS was also participant of the struggle of the Lear Corporation workers, which was considered by the CEOs of the main companiesin the country as one of the most important conflicts in 2014, which included 240 dismissals, 21 demonstrations in the main highway of Buenos Aires, 16 National Days of Struggle with pickets throughout the country, 5 repressions, 22 detainees, 80 injured, 16 judicial measures in favor of the workers, two weeks of lockout by the bosses, etc.

Before the FIT 
In 1999, José Montes, rank-and-file delegate of the Río Santiago Shipyard, ran as presidential candidate along Oscar Hernández, Siderar worker, as vicepresident under the slogan "workers vote for workers" (in Spanish: "trabajador vote trabajador") and stressing not to pay the foreign debt.

In the 2001 legislative elections, the PTS presented candidates in 7 districts, obtaining 105,849 votes for national deputies. After the 2001 crisis, the PTS refused to run candidates for the 2003 elections, calling for boycott and for a "general strike until all of them go and impose a Revolutionary Constituent Assembly”.

For the 2007 elections, the PTS went on coalition with the MAS and Socialist Left under the name "Left and Workers' Front for Socialism" (in Spanish: Frente de Izquierda de los Trabajadores por el Socialismo), winning nearly 100,000 votes (0,57%) with José Montes as candidate. In 2009, the PTS went on a similar coalition named "Anti-capitalist and Socialist Left Front" (in Spanish: Frente de Izquierda Anticapitalista y Socialista), being fifth place in important districts such as Córdoba and the Buenos Aires Province, duplicating their votes that year.

Workers' Left Front 
In 2011, the PTS formed, along with the Workers' Party (PO) and Socialist Left (IS) the Workers' Left Front (FIT from its Spanish acronym), which stood Jorge Altamira (PO) as presidential candidate and Christian Castillo (PTS) as vice-president. In the primary elections they obtained 500.000 votes and in the general elections 660.000 for national deputies.

Currently, as member of the FIT, the PTS has parliamentary representation in Córdoba, Neuquén, and other provinces.

In the 2013 elections, the FIT won nearly 1,300,000 votes nationally. Nicolás del Caño, as member of the FIT, was elected as national deputy for the Mendoza province with 14% of votes. In June 2015, Myriam Bregman also won a seat as PTS deputy for Buenos Aires Province.

In the 2015 elections in Mendoza, Noelia Barbeito, PTS candidate for governor, got third place with 110 226 votes (10,32%). Nicolás del Caño, in the elections for mayor of that province's capital city, was the second most voted candidate with 17% of votes and winning over the Front for Victory.

In the primary elections of August 2015, the PTS, presenting their slate with Nicolás del Caño as presidential candidate and Myriam Bregman as vice-president, won with 51,07% (370.764 votes) in the inner elections against the PO-IS slate that proposed Jorge Altamira as president and Juan Carlos Giordano as vice-president, which obtained 48,93% (355.290 votes). The PTS slate also won in 13 provinces.

Organization

Publications 
The PTS created the Karl Marx Institute for Socialist Thought And the Leon Trotsky Research, Study and Publications Center, the latter of which is recognised as the only one in South America dedicated to publishing and spreading of the Russian revolutionary's works and that of the international trotskyist movement. Both institutions possess a library of over 3,000 volumes specialized in Marxism and the history of the international and Argentine labour movement and are located in a building in downtown Buenos Aires (Riobamba 144), where courses and seminars are dictated and several research projects are organised.

The PTS has also published several individual works such as the "Lucha de Clases" (class struggle)magazine, having its own contributions written to update fundamental elements of Marxism to contemporary reality.

For over a decade the PTS has also taught the Karl Marx Free Cathedra in several universities of Argentina. The Free Cathedra is a series of conferences made to discuss ideologically and whose main subjects have a wide variety of topics, from analising Marxist theory to interpreting current historical phenomena through it.

It used to edit its printed newspaper, called La Verdad Obrera ("working-class truth"), but since 2015 it publishes the digital online newspaper La Izquierda Diario ("the daily left"), and the bi-monthly magazine Ideas de Izquierda ("ideas from the left"), having collaborations with independent leftist intellectuals. Along the Trotskyist Fraction - Fourth International, its international organization, the PTS publishes the International Strategy magazine and several books on Marxist theory and compilations of classic authors.

It also has a website that is daily updated, renewed since early 2007 with multimedia information.

Every week, the PTS hosted the radio talk show "Pateando el Tablero" ("kicking the board"), now known as El Círculo Rojo (the red circle), as well as similar talk shows in several parts of the country.

Since March 24, 2009, the PTS broadcast an Internet TV program called TVPTS, with live transmissions, DVD productions and projections in giant screens. Its website is daily updated and has over 2000 ranging from several topics. Furthermore, the PTS organises the cinema group Contraimagen, which has produced several documentaries.

Since 2012, the PTS made the TV program Giro a la Izquierda (turn to the left), in the city of Córdoba, broadcast through CanalC.

Youth 
In all 20 universities of the country, the PTS organises students through their student branch "En Clave Roja" (red key), conformed by PTS youth militants and independent activists. In highschools, the PTS does the same through their student branch "No Pasarán". It's part of the school presidencies of the Social Science and Philosophy schools of the University of Buenos Aires, the Humanities School of the UNGS (General Sarmiento) and the IUNA. Nationally, along with women students and independent female workers, the PTS makes work through its women branch Pan y Rosas (Bread and Roses). Between late 2010 and early 2011, the party's youth organization was re-structured and they formed the PTS Youth as a general youth branch that groups both university and highschool students as well as young worker militants.

International 
The PTS, internationally, is the largest section of the Trotskyist Fraction – Fourth International, being a founding section of it along the Worker Revolutionary League of Bolivia and the Workers' League for Socialism - Contracorriente (now known as the Socialist Workers' Movement) of Mexico; other members include the Workers' Revolutionary Movement of Brazil, the Venezuelan Workers' League for Socialism, the Revolutionary Workers' Party of Chile, the Workers' Current for Socialism of Uruguay, the Revolutionary Internationalist Organisation of Germany, the Revolutionary Communist Tendency within the French NPA, and the Workers' Revolutionary Current of Spain.

Electoral history

Presidential elections

Congress elections

References

External links
Official web site

Communist parties in Argentina
Argentina
Trotskyist organisations in Argentina
Political parties established in 1988
1988 establishments in Argentina